Mateus is a Portuguese given name and surname, equivalent to the English Matthew. Notable people with the name include:

Given name
 Mateus (ambassador), Armenian ambassador of Emperor Dawit II of Ethiopia
 Mateus Alves (born 2001), Brazilian tennis player
 Mateus dos Anjos (born 1983), Brazilian footballer
 Mateus Asato (born 1993), Brazilian guitarist
 Mateus Soares de Azevedo (born 1959), Brazilian historian
 Mateus de Oliveira Barbosa (born 1987), Brazilian footballer
 Mateus Borelli (born 1993), Brazilian footballer
 Mateus Garcia Borges (born 1983), Brazilian footballer
 Mateus Caramelo (1994-2016), Brazilian footballer
 Mateus Evangelista Cardoso (born 1994), Brazilian athlete
 Mateus dos Santos Castro (born 1994), Brazilian footballer
 Mateus Costa, Indian football head coach
 Mateus Galiano da Costa (born 1984), Angolan footballer
 Mateus Lima Cruz (born 1993), Brazilian footballer
 Mateus Fernandes (died 1515), Portuguese architect
 Mateus Aparecido de Oliveira Fonseca (born 1995), Brazilian footballer
 Mateus Fonseca (born 1993), Portuguese footballer
 Mateus Alberto Contreiras Gonçalves (born 1983), Angolan footballer
 Mateus Gregório (born 1993), Brazilian weightlifter
 Mateus Alonso Honorio (born 1983), Brazilian footballer
 Mateus Facho Inocêncio (born 1981), Brazilian athlete
 Mateus de Brito Júnior, Angolan minister
 Mateus Versolato Júnior (born 1983), Brazilian goalkeeper
 Mateus Levendi (born 1993), Albanian footballer
 Mateus Lopes (born 1975), Cape Verdean footballer
 Mateus Müller de Souza Lopes (born 1995), Brazilian footballer
 Mateus Alves Maciel (born 1988), Brazilian footballer
 Mateus Gonçalves Martins (born 1994), Brazilian footballer
 Mateus da Costa Meira (born 1975), perpetrator of the 1999 Morumbi Shopping shooting
 Mateus Moreira (died 1645), Brazilian Catholic martyr
 Mateus Norton (born 1996), Brazilian footballer
 Mateus Vicente de Oliveira (1706-1786), Portuguese architect 
 Mateus Paraná (born 1987), Brazilian football striker
 Mateus Pasinato (born 1992), Brazilian goalkeeper
 Mateus Mendes Ferreira Pires (born 1992), Brazilian footballer
 Mateus Meira Rita, São Toméan politician
 Mateus de Sá (born 1995), Brazilian athlete
 Mateus Shkreta (born 1994), Albanian footballer
 Mateus da Silva (born 1991), Brazilian footballer
 Mateus de Oliveira Silva (born 1994), Brazilian football midfielder
 Mateus Ferreira da Silva (born 1995), Brazilian footballer
 Mateus Solano (born 1981), Brazilian actor
 Mateus Feliciano Augusto Tomás (1958-2010), Angolan Roman Catholic bishop
 Mateus Uribe (born 1991), Colombian professional footballer
 Mateus Vital (born 1998), Brazilian footballer
 Mateus Viveiros (born 1966), Brazilian football player
 Mateus Ward (born 1999), American actor
 Mateus de Oliveira Xavier (1858-1929), Portuguese Roman Catholic Diocese

Surname
 David Mateus (born 1980), Portuguese rugby union footballer
 Diogo Mateus (born 1980), Portuguese rugby union footballer
 Octávio Mateus (born 1975), Portuguese dinosaur paleontologist and biologist

See also
Matthias

Portuguese masculine given names
Portuguese-language surnames